The Carleton County Historical Society (CCHS), located in southwest New Brunswick, Canada was established in 1960.

It maintains an extensive collection of historical artifacts and archival material. They maintain two historic buildings, the Old Carleton County Court House, 19 Court Street, Upper Woodstock, and the Honourable Charles Connell House, 128 Connell Street, Woodstock, which doubles as the society's headquarters and as a museum.

President: John Thompson
Executive Director: Kellie Blue-McQuade

References

External links 
 Carleton County Historical Society

Non-profit organizations based in New Brunswick
Carleton County, New Brunswick
Organizations established in 1960
Historical societies of Canada
Woodstock, New Brunswick